Thingyan Museum is a 2016 Burmese romantic-drama film, directed by Maung Myo Min starring Sai Sai Kham Leng, Khin Wint Wah and Nan Su Oo. The film, produced by Frenzo Production and Heart & Soul Film Production premiered in Myanmar on April 1, 2016.

Cast
Sai Sai Kham Leng as Sai Sai
Khin Wint Wah as Mya Thar 
Nan Su Oo as Hazel
Aung Lwin as Aphoe
Si Thu as Phoe Shoute

References

External links

2016 films
2010s Burmese-language films
Burmese romantic drama films
Films shot in Myanmar
2016 romantic drama films